Tekari is a city and a municipality in Gaya district in the Indian state of Bihar and was the centre of erstwhile Bhumihar Tekari Raj. Maharaja Gopalsaran was the king of this area in British times.

Etymology
In South Bihar, the representative of several communities was the Tekari family, whose great estate, Tekari Raj, in Gaya, dates back to the early 18th century.
In the Mughal period, Tekari evolved as a rich estate, protected by Bhumihar kings, who were a part of the Mughal Empire.
The royal emblem of the Kingdom of Tekari was a pigeon attacking over an eagle sat on the perch of a tree. Pundits concluded, "this jungle of tetris (tetri, a kind of tree) is the place where the fort should be made," and declared it very lucky. Tetri, vis-à-vis Tekari. (Tekari used to be a popular place name during the Muslim period). It perhaps indicated a place office for local administration and tax collection and residence of local chief. It may also have been a market place.

Maharaja Hit Narayan Singh of Tekari was said to have been "a man of a religious turn of mind... who became an ascetic and left his vast property in the hands of his wife" shortly after inheriting much of the estate in the 1840s.

Demographics
 India census, Tekari had a population of 17,615. Males constitute 52% of the population and females 48%. Tekari has an average literacy rate of 66%, higher than the national average of 59.5%: male literacy is 74%, and female literacy is 57%. In Tekari, 17% of the population is under 6 years of age.

References

Cities and towns in Gaya district
Princely states of India
Forts in Bihar